McCabe v. Atchison, Topeka & Santa Fe Railway Company, 235 U.S. 151 (1914), was a United States Supreme Court case in which the Court ruled against a challenge to Oklahoma's law requiring separate but equal railroad accommodations.

Statute
The Separate Coach Law required railroads to provide separate, but equal, compartments for African-American and Caucasian passengers. Section 7 of the law allowed the railroads to provide sleeping cars, dining cars and chair cars for both white and black patrons. However, in practice, the railroads provided fewer services to African Americans because of lower anticipated demand.

Facts
Four African-American citizens filed suit against the railroads seeking to restrain them from complying with the law. They filed suit against the railroads before the law went into effect but amended their claim after the law became effective.

The United States Court of Appeals for the Eighth Circuit upheld an order sustaining the railroads' demurrers and dismissing the suit. Appellants sought review.

Decision
The court affirmed the appellate court's order.
The court held that section 7 of the law was improperly enacted based on the consideration of the limited demand by African-Americans for sleeping, dining, and chair cars.
However, appellants' suit was properly dismissed because appellants had not traveled on any of the railroads, requested transportation on the railroads, or requested any of the facilities described in section 7 of the law.
Further, there was no proof that the railroads had refused to provide the facilities described in section 7 of the law to appellants.
Finally, there was no proof that appellants would not have had an adequate remedy at law if the railroads had denied equal facilities to appellants.

See also
 United States v. Santa Fe Pacific Railroad Co.
 List of United States Supreme Court cases, volume 235

References

External links
 

1914 in United States case law
Atchison, Topeka and Santa Fe Railway
Passenger rail transportation in Oklahoma
United States equal protection case law
United States Supreme Court cases
United States Supreme Court cases of the White Court